Josef Neštický (born 25 January 1951) is a Czech rower. He competed at the 1976 Summer Olympics and the 1980 Summer Olympics.

References

External links
 

1951 births
Living people
Czech male rowers
Olympic rowers of Czechoslovakia
Rowers at the 1976 Summer Olympics
Rowers at the 1980 Summer Olympics
People from Šternberk
Sportspeople from the Olomouc Region